Sheer Luck is a 1931 American crime film directed by Bruce M. Mitchell and starring Jobyna Ralston, Nick Stuart and Philo McCullough.

Cast
 Jobyna Ralston as Betty Carver 
 Nick Stuart as Jimmie Reid 
 Bobby Vernon as Archibald Smith 
 Philo McCullough as Milton Blackburn 
 Reed Howes as 'Rabbit' Rossi 
 Margaret Landis as Mrs. Hiram Carver 
 John Ince as Hiram Carver 
 Oscar Smith as Washington Jefferson Smith 
 Margaret Irving as Patsy 
 Tom London as Police Lieutenant

References

Bibliography
 Michael R. Pitts. Poverty Row Studios, 1929–1940: An Illustrated History of 55 Independent Film Companies, with a Filmography for Each. McFarland & Company, 2005.

External links
 

1931 films
1931 crime films
American crime films
Films directed by Bruce M. Mitchell
1930s English-language films
1930s American films